Lungu is a village in Estonia.

Lungu may also refer to:

Surname

Politicians
Edgar Lungu, (b 1956) President of Zambia
Esther Lungu, (b 1961) First Lady of Zambia

Sports players
Adrian Lungu, (b 1960) Romanian rugby union player
Alexandru Lungu (fighter), (b 1974) Romanian martial artist
Andrei Lungu, (b 1989) Romanian football player
Caius Lungu, (b 1989) Romanian football player
Cezar Lungu, (b 1988) Romanian football player
Florin Lungu, (b 1980) Romanian football player
Gheorghe Lungu, (b 1978) Romanian boxer
Teodor Lungu, (b 1995) Moldovan footballer
Vladislav Lungu, (b 1977) Moldovan footballer

Authors
Alexandru Lungu (poet) (1924-2008) Romanian poet
Dan Lungu, (b 1969) Romanian novelist

Other uses
Lungu people of Central Africa
Lungu language, spoken by the Lungu people

Romanian-language surnames
Zambian surnames
Lozi-language surnames